Spasskoye is a rural locality (a village) in Tavtimanovsky Selsoviet, Iglinsky District, Bashkortostan, Russia. The population was 11 as of 2010.

Geography 
Spasskoye is located 24 km northeast of Iglino (the district's administrative centre) by road. Pokrovka is the nearest rural locality.

References 

Rural localities in Iglinsky District